Andrew Glover (born 1962) is an English composer. His music has been played by many national and international performers and ensembles including the BBC Symphony Orchestra under Martyn Brabbins and Grant Llewellyn and the English Northern Philharmonia under Paul Daniel, and is mainly performed abroad from Mexico to Russia among other places and artists. He was a visiting Composition Lecturer at the Birmingham Conservatoire (BCU) until early 2014.

Biography
Glover was born in Birmingham, UK. He studied in Nottingham and gained his Doctorate in 1994 from Keele University after studying with George Nicholson . His composition is influenced by world music and rock. He has won several competitions.

His best-known work is the aggressive work for orchestra "Fractured Vistas" from 1995. Played and broadcast in various countries and shortlisted in the Lutoslawski Prize in 1997.

In 2000 he began working on his concerto The Death of Angels: A Concerto for Violin and Orchestra, based on John Milton's Paradise Lost. This work was premiered and broadcast by the BBC in February 2003.

His 45-minute Piano Concerto took four years to compose between 2002 and 2006 but remains unperformed to date but he has always stated that he feels it is his best work.

After three years research, experimentation with Sound Files and electronic principles and historic research into the Eastern Roman Empire he completed his "Symphony No.2: Byzantium" in 2009 which was released on the CDP label in Britain. Further research and experimentation produced the "Anglo Saxon Trilogy" based on Anglo Saxon culture and language. Both works are for fixed media (CD).

In April 2013 a 50th birthday concert at the Birmingham Conservatoire of Music showcased some of his more recent chamber music to great critical praise.

Musical style 
Glover worked as a semi-professional flautist as a student and much of his output features the flute, with several commissioned compositions for the Japanese/Mexican flutist Asako Arai.

Much of Glover's early work dealt with the manipulation of pulse and time. He said in an interview on BBC Radio in 2004 that his fascination in this area came from watching nature's natural rhythms of life change and move at different rates of change, and "the sound of the great earth cracking…". This informed the works in his PhD thesis and culminated in works such as Fractured Vistas and The Fickle Virgin of Seventeen Summers.

This research work lead to his study of the polyrhythmic, micro-macro aleatory works of György Ligeti and Witold Lutosławski. His own work is something of a development of these ideas into a more modern idiom, this is particularly evident in the slow movements of his Violin and Flute Concertos.

Alleged political stance 
In November 2008 a database with names of British National Party members was made public by Wikileaks, with Dr Andrew Glover's name, address, phone number, email address and a short biography appearing on the list. Subsequently, in the Daily Mirror, Alun Palmer quoted Glover as saying "I am not particularly open about my involvement in the BNP because people choose to presume we are racists." The then Deputy Chairman of the BNP, Simon Darby, said the source of the leak could be a disgruntled ex-member.

Thereupon, in March 2009, a petition launched by Rose Mitchell (a second-year student), Love Music Hate Racism and Unite Against Fascism sought to have Glover removed from his post as visiting lecturer at Birmingham City University due to his alleged membership. Mitchell said she had been shocked by allegations that Glover was a BNP member. "He teaches students from all over the world. I don't have any evidence that he has behaved in a racist way towards students," she said, adding that the allegation that he was involved in a far-Right party was "very worrying". The effort failed.

Simon Darby said "He [Glover] is merely a member, or an alleged member, of the BNP and is being driven from his job as a result". The BNP advised those named on the list to deny their membership and said that they would confirm that in writing if required. In a Times Higher Education Supplement interview Glover denied being a current member of the BNP and accused the left wing of a "1950s McCarthy witch-hunt" against him.

Selected compositions 
 The Stones Speak Czech (1994) Soprano & Microtonal Ensemble.
 Fractured Vistas (1995) Orchestra
 The Bloodied Moon (1995) Soprano and Mixed Ensemble
 The Fickle Virgin of Seventeen Summers (1996)String Quartet
 Seven Disparate Visions of Quetzalcoatal (1997) Solo Flute
 Ashes: After The Fracture: A Symphony for Orchestra (1997)
 Wind Carvings (1998) Woodwind Quintet
 The Death of Angels: A Concerto for Violin and Orchestra (2000)
 The End of the Circle (2001) Piano
 Cretan Dragonfly (2003) Flute, Vibraphone and 12 Solo Strings
 Thowring (1997/2003) Harp
 Cretan Nights: A Concerto for Clarinet and Chamber Orchestra (2004)
 Byzantine Melody No.4 (2006) Descant Recorder and Piano
 Reasons of Darkness, Excuses of Light (2007) Baglama and Mixed Ensemble
 Thowring 3: Threnoidia (1997/2003/2008) Chamber Orchestra
 Symphony No.2: Byzantium (2006–2009) Electronic (CD)
 Eardstapa (2010) for Baritone/Narrator, Anglo Saxon Lyre, and Mixed Chamber Ensemble
 Faeder Ure (Lord's Prayer) (2010)Electronic (CD)
 The Anglo Saxon Trilogy (2010) Electronic (CD)
 Flute Sonata "Remember" (2011/12) Flute and Piano
 Earth-Stepper: A Sonata for Recorder player and Piano (2013)
 Earth Stepper Runes (2013) for Clarinet Cello and Piano
 The Old Grumbly Bear(2004) Solo for Bassoon with band accompaniment

References

Sources

 Lander, J (2006). "Glover, An Unheard Original", New Music Magazine, May 2006.UK.
 Green, D (2003). " An Unusual Man Speaks of His Music", Village Magazine, June 2003.USA.
 Gaudeamus Foundation, Amsterdam Nederlands.
 Article in Libre, "New Music Hits the Mark" Mexican Newspaper 1997.
 Article in Libre, "Meet the New Voices Being Heard this Week" Mexican Newspaper 2003.
 Program notes from "The 23rd 'Manuel Enriques' Festival of New Music", Mexico, 2001.
 Program notes from "The 25th 'Manuel Enriques' Festival of New Music", Mexico, 2003.
 Article in Leeds "Echo", 1997.
 Glover, A (1994). "Andrew Glover: Composition by Research".(PhD Thesis), Keele University 1994.
 Birmingham Central Music Library, Birmingham (Scores).

English composers
1962 births
Living people
Musicians from Birmingham, West Midlands
Alumni of Keele University
Academics of Birmingham City University